Differing literary and colloquial readings for certain Chinese characters are a common feature of many Chinese varieties, and the reading distinctions for these linguistic doublets often typify a dialect group. Literary readings (/) are usually used in loanwords, names (geographic and personal), literary works (like poetry), and in formal settings, while colloquial/vernacular readings (/) are usually used in everyday vernacular speech.

For example, in Mandarin, the character for the word "white" is normally read with the colloquial pronunciation bái, but as a name or in certain formal or historical settings it can be read with the literary pronunciation bó.  This example is particularly well known due to its effect on the modern pronunciation of the names of the Tang dynasty (618–907) poets Bai Juyi and Li Bai (alternatively, "Bo Juyi" and "Li Bo").

The differing pronunciations led linguists to explore the linguistic strata. It is generally believed that the colloquial readings represent a substratum, while their literary counterparts a superstratum. Such differences reflect a history of dialect mixing and the influence of education and instruction on the area.

Characteristics
For a given Chinese variety, colloquial readings typically reflect native phonology, while literary readings typically originate from other Chinese varieties, typically more prestigious varieties. Colloquial readings are usually older, resembling the sound systems described by old rime dictionaries such as Guangyun. Literary readings are closer to the phonology of newer sound systems. In certain Mandarin and Wu dialects, many literary readings are the result of Nanjing Mandarin or Beijing Mandarin influence in the Ming and Qing dynasties.

Literary readings are usually used in formal settings because past prestigious varieties were usually used in formal education and discourse. Although the phonology of the Chinese variety in which this occurred did not entirely match that of the prestige variety when in formal settings, they tended to evolve toward the prestige variety. Also, neologisms usually use the pronunciation of prestigious varieties. Colloquial readings are usually used in informal settings because their usage in formal settings has been supplanted by the readings of the prestige varieties.

Because of this, the frequency of literary readings in a Chinese variety reflects its history and status. For example, before the promotion of Modern Standard Chinese (Mandarin), the Mandarin dialects of the Central Plain had few literary readings, but they now have literary readings that resemble the phonology of Modern Standard Chinese. On the other hand, the relatively influential Beijing and Canton dialects have fewer literary readings than other varieties.

In some Chinese varieties, there may be many instances of foreign readings replacing native readings, forming many sets of literary and colloquial readings. A newer literary reading may replace an older literary reading, and the older literary reading may become disused or become a new colloquial reading. Sometimes literary and colloquial readings of the same character have different meanings.

The analogous phenomenon exists to a much more significant degree in Japanese, where individual characters (kanji) generally have two common readings – the newer borrowed, more formal on'yomi, and the older native, more colloquial kun'yomi. Unlike in Chinese varieties, which are genetically related, in Japanese the borrowed readings are unrelated to the native readings. Further, many kanji in fact have several borrowed readings, reflecting borrowings at different periods – these multiple borrowings are generally doublets or triplets, sometimes quite distant. These readings are generally used in particular contexts, such as older readings for Buddhist terms, which were early borrowings.

Behavior in Chinese

Cantonese
In Cantonese, there are regular relationships between the nuclei of literary and colloquial readings. Colloquial readings with  nuclei correspond with literary  and  nuclei. It is also the case with colloquial  and literary , and colloquial  and literary . Of course, not all colloquial readings with a certain nucleus correspond to literary readings with another nucleus. The meaning of a character is often differentiated depending on whether it is read with a colloquial or literary reading.

Examples:

Hakka
Hakka contains instances of differing literary and colloquial readings.

Examples:

Mandarin
Literary readings in Modern Standard Mandarin are usually native pronunciations more conservative than colloquial readings. This is because they reflect readings from before Beijing was the capital, e.g. from the Ming Dynasty. Most instances where there are different literary and colloquial readings occur with characters that have entering tones. Among those are primarily literary readings that have not been adopted into the Beijing dialect before the Yuan Dynasty. Colloquial readings of other regions have also been adopted into the Beijing dialect, a major difference being that literary readings are usually adopted with the colloquial readings. Some of the differences between the national standards of Taiwanese Mandarin and mainland Chinese Pǔtōnghuà are due to the fact that Putonghua tends to adopt colloquial readings for a character while Guoyu tends to adopt a literary reading.

Examples of literary readings adopted into the Beijing dialect:

Examples of colloquial readings adopted into the Beijing dialect:

Sichuanese
In Sichuanese, colloquial readings tend to resemble Ba-Shu Chinese (Middle Sichuanese) or Southern Proto-Mandarin in Ming Dynasty, while literary readings tend to resemble modern standard Mandarin. For example, in the Yaoling Dialect the colloquial reading of  "" (meaning "things") is [], which is very similar to  its pronunciation of Ba-Shu Chinese in Song Dynasty (960 - 1279). Meanwhile, its literary reading, [], is relatively similar to the standard Mandarin pronunciation []. The table below shows some Chinese characters with both literary and colloquial readings in Sichuanese.

Wu
In the northern Wu-speaking region, the main sources of literary readings are the Beijing and Nanjing dialects during the Ming and Qing dynasties, and Modern Standard Chinese. In the southern Wu-speaking region, literary readings tend to be adopted from the Hangzhou dialect. Colloquial readings tend to reflect an older sound system.

Not all Wu dialects behave the same way. Some have more instances of discrepancies between literary and colloquial readings than others. For example, the character  had a  initial in Middle Chinese, and in literary readings, there is a null initial. In colloquial readings it is pronounced  in Songjiang.

Some must be read in one particular reading. For example,  must be read using the literary reading, and  must be read using the colloquial reading, .

Examples:

Min Nan
Min languages, such as Taiwanese Hokkien, separate  reading pronunciations from spoken pronunciations and explications.

The following examples in Pe̍h-oē-jī show differences in character readings in Taiwanese Hokkien:

In addition, some characters have multiple and unrelated pronunciations, adapted to represent Hokkien words. For example, the Hokkien word bah ("meat") is often written with the character 肉, which has etymologically unrelated colloquial and literary readings (he̍k and jio̍k, respectively).

For more explanation, see Literary and colloquial readings in Hokkien.

Min Dong
In the Fuzhou dialect of Min Dong, literary readings are mainly used in formal phrases and words derived from the written language, while the colloquial ones are used in more colloquial phrases. Phonologically, a large range of phonemes can differ between the character's two readings: in tone, final, initial, or any and all of these features.

The following table uses Foochow Romanized as well as IPA for some of the major differences in readings.

Gan
The following are examples of variations between literary and colloquial readings of Chinese characters in Gan Chinese.

See also
 Onyomi
 Reconstructions of Old Chinese, for a more detailed study on historical Chinese pronunciation
 Sino-Japanese vocabulary
 Sino-Korean vocabulary
 Sino-Vietnamese vocabulary#Monosyllabic loanwords
 Sino-Xenic pronunciations

References

Further reading
 
王洪君 (Wang Hong-jun). (2009). 兼顾演变、推平和层次的汉语方言历史关系模型 [A Historical relation model of Chinese dialects with multiple perspectives of evolution, level and stratum]. 方言, 2009(3), 204–218.
 
 
 
李蓝. (2014). 文白异读的形成模式与北京话的文白异读. 中国社会科学, 9, 163–179.
 
 
 
耿振生. (2003). 北京话文白异读的形成. 语言学论丛, 27.
康韶真(Khng Siâu-Tsin). (2013). 少年人對台語文白選讀ê使用情形kap影響因素 [The Usage Situation and Influencing Factors for Young People's Choice of Colloquial or Literary Pronunciations in Taiwanese]. Journal of Taiwanese Vernacular, 5(2), 38–53.
張堅 (Zhang Jian). (2018). 潮州方言的「正音」與新文讀層次 [Zhengyin and the New Literary Pronunciation of Chaozhou Dialect]. 漢學研究, 36(3), 209–234.
陳忠敏 (Chen Zhongmin). (2018). 吳語、江淮官話的層次分類：以古從邪崇船禪諸聲母的讀音層次為依據 [Strata Subgrouping of Wu and Jianghuai Mandarin Dialects—Based on the Pronunciations of Some Initials in Middle Chinese]. 漢學研究, 36(3), 295–317.
楊秀芳 (Yang Hsiu-fang). (1982). 閩南語文白系統的研究(Doctoral dissertation). Department of Chinese Literature, National Taiwan University.
賴文英. (2014). 臺灣客語文白異讀探究. Hakka Affairs Council, Taiwan R.O.C.

Chinese characters
Varieties of Chinese